Leonte Răutu (until 1945 Lev Nikolayevich (Nicolaievici) Oigenstein; February 28, 1910 –September 1993) was a Bessarabian-born Romanian communist activist and propagandist. He was chief ideologist of the Romanian Communist Party ("Workers' Party") during the rule of Gheorghe Gheorghiu-Dej, and one of his country's few high-ranking communists to have studied Marxism from the source. His adventurous youth, with two prison terms served for illegal political activity, culminated in his self-exile to the Soviet Union, where he spent the larger part of World War II. Specializing in agitprop and becoming friends with communist militant Ana Pauker, Răutu made his way back to Romania during the communization process of the late 1940s, and became a feared potentate of the Romanian communist regime. As head of the Communist Party's new Agitprop Section, he devised some of the most controversial cultural policies, and managed to survive Pauker's downfall in 1952.

As Gheorghiu-Dej's assistant, Răutu played a leading part in all the successive avatars of Romanian communism: he was a Stalinist and Zhdanovist before 1955, an anti-revisionist until 1958, and a national communist since. During this long transition, he instigated (and gave a Marxist backing to) the successive campaigns against Gheorghiu-Dej's political adversaries, selectively purged academia of suspected anti-communists, and deposed some of his own supporters. He became widely hated for his perceived lack of scruples, depicted by disgraced communist writers as "the perfect acrobat" or "Malvolio".

Răutu preserved some of his influence after his national communist friend Nicolae Ceaușescu took over the party leadership. He lost his Agitprop prerogatives, but became instead rector of the party's own Ștefan Gheorghiu Academy, and still played a part in defining the official dogmas. He returned to favor in the earliest 1980s, as Ceaușescu fell back on Marxism-Leninism, but was eventually deposed in 1981, as punishment for his daughter's decision to emigrate. He was kept under watch for his alleged contacts with the KGB and spent the rest of his life in relative obscurity, witnessing the fall of communism in 1989.

Biography

Early activities
Rătu's birthplace was Bălți (Byeltsi), a city in the Bessarabia Governorate, Russian Empire, where his father, Nikolai Ivanovich Oigenstein (or Nicolai Ivanovici Oighenstein), worked as a pharmacist. The Oigensteins were Russian-educated Jews, and did not speak Romanian until ca. 1920. Some communist sources suggest that Răutu was born in Romania proper, at Fălticeni, but this account is either misled or misleading. Lev Nikolayevich (later Leonte or Leonea) was the eldest of three brothers; Dan (later Dan Răutu) was the second-born; the third brother, Mikhail, would later take the name of Mihail "Mișa" Oișteanu.

Lev witnessed the birth of Greater Romania from Bălți, where he remained until his high-school graduation. He later relocated to the Bukovina region, and, in 1928, was in Bucharest, the national capital. The future ideologist entered the University of Bucharest to study mathematics, but never graduated. (He may also have spent a while at the Bucharest Medical School.) He entered the Communist Youth in 1929 and the party itself in 1931; his brother Dan headed the Communist Students Organization from 1932, and was accepted into the party in 1933. In the years when the Romanian Communist Party (PCR, later "Workers' Party", or PMR) was banned, Lev was editor of the party organ Scînteia and worked with Ștefan Foriș, Lucrețiu Pătrășcanu, Valter Roman, Sorin Toma, Mircea Bălănescu and Tatiana Leapis (later Bulan). Leapis was Răutu's first wife, but left him for Foriș.

Characterized as intelligent, ironic and well-informed, Răutu preferred to read Russian and Soviet literature. Although lacking a thorough training in philosophy, he was one of the few PCR activists with a certain knowledge of Marxist and even non-Marxist theory, but despised most forms of continental philosophy and modernism. Political scientist Vladimir Tismăneanu describes Răutu as comparable with some other Eastern European dogmatic Stalinists, from Jakub Berman and József Révai to Kurt Hager. In this definition, Răutu was a "self-hating intellectual". 

Historian Lucian Boia believes that, in adopting communism, Răutu forfeited his Jewishness and "became abstract", an "ideological soldier". Tismăneanu also notes that Răutu separated from his Jewish roots very early in life, growing up into Russian culture, condemning all expression of Jewish nationalism, and becoming classifiable as a "non-Jewish Jew". Likewise, historian Lucian Nastasă describes Răutu as one of the Romanian communists who were "less dominated by the obsession of ethnic affiliation (the religious one being entirely excluded by the aggressive atheism promoted in the Soviet Union)"; Răutu and others were instead animated by their "obedience to the Soviet Union." Communist Silviu Brucan, who worked under Răutu and was also Jewish, recalls that PMR leader Gheorghe Gheorghiu-Dej had a condescending view of Răutu as "Jewish and culturally Russian".

Răutu was first tried for sedition while still in the Communist Youth, and sentenced to a one-year prison term by the authorities of the Kingdom of Romania. He was for a while held in Chișinău jail, then moved to Doftana prison, in the company of other PCR militants, becoming acquainted with many of Romania's future political bosses. Shortly after being released, in 1932, he was again on trial: until 1934, he was again in prison, first at the penitentiary facility of Cernăuți and then at Jilava prison. This episode ended with him becoming an activist for the communist committee in Bucharest, and head of its Agitprop section. After his breakup with Tatiana Leapis, the young activist met his future wife Natalia "Niunia" Redel, herself Jewish and Russian-educated. Also implicated in the communist underground, she found employment with a clinic ran by physician Leon Ghelerter, himself politically active with the United Socialists.

As recounted by Sorin Toma, in 1936 or 1937 Răutu personally witnessed, and excused, Foriș's mental breakdown. Following the outbreak of the Spanish Civil War, Răutu was among those tasked with recruiting Romanian leftists for the International Brigades. This was one of his final activities in Greater Romania. Answering a call for repatriation, Răutu and Natalia emigrated to the Soviet Union following the 1940 occupation of Bessarabia. Before leaving, he entrusted his documents to Foriș's lover and secretary, Victoria Sârbu. Although Jewish, he was not dissuaded by the interval of Nazi–Soviet cooperation: once relocated to the Moldavian SSR, he was made co-editor of Pămînt Sovietic ("Soviet Land"), a propaganda magazine. He may have also been an ideological instructor for the Bessarabian Communist Party.

Lev and Natalia were married in the Soviet Union. Little is known about the couple in the months that followed the Nazi and Romanian attack on the Soviet Union. They escaped Bessarabia, and fled further inland: Răutu is said to have been a mere laborer at a sand quarry and a kolkhoz. He and Natalia had two children, both of whom died, probably of hunger, during the months of Soviet retreat. At some point (perhaps in 1943), Răutu became head of the Radio Moscow Romanian-language division, making him a favorite of exile faction leader Ana Pauker's, together with Valter Roman and Petre Borilă. According to sociologist and former communist Pavel Câmpeanu, he owed Pauker not only his career, but also his life, since it was her who made sure that Răutu and the others were never called up for active duty. This assignment also placed Răutu in direct contact with some of Pauker's colleagues in the Comintern: he replaced Basil Spiru, of Marx University fame, and was supervised by Rudolf Slánský. His other job was as book editor for the Foreign Languages Publishing House.

Communist rise
Răutu returned to Romania in 1945 at Pauker's request and immediately rose to the top of the party's propaganda apparatus, as Iosif Chișinevschi's deputy, joining the editorial team of the revived Scînteia, and becoming one of the most active contributors to Contemporanul monthly. The Romanian-sounding surname of Răutu, picked out after a Romanianization policy was imposed by the PCR doctrinaires, may have been borrowed from the novels of Lev's one favorite Romanian author, Constantin Stere. Lev and Natalia had two daughters: Anca, born 1947, and Elena ("Lena"), born 1951. The family was integrated into the nomenklatura and lived in villas located near the political epicenter that was the Primăverii compound: Londra Street, then Turgheniev Street. The other Oigensteins and the Redels also moved to Romania.

According to Câmpeanu, Răutu and illustrated the "abundance of Jews within the structures of Romania's emergent Stalinism"—though the overall Jewish community had few communists, the propaganda apparatus was subject to an "overwhelming Jewification". Câmpeanu proposes that the most likely explanation for this fact is that the two men "preferred to work with people of their own ethnicity, a preference that may have been strengthened by the existence of some older personal relations." He finds that this was an anomaly, since, in other branches of the party, apostate Jews would resort an antisemitism which was "more cynical, aggressive and capricious than the native variant".

Răutu's Scînteia articles were noted for their bitter irony and for the vehemence of the insults they addressed to political enemies, in particular the National Peasants' Party and its organ Dreptatea. He was among the fiercest critics of multiparty, pluralist democracy, together with Brucan, Sorin Toma, Ștefan Voicu, Nestor Ignat, Nicolae Moraru, Miron Radu Paraschivescu and Traian Șelmaru. Răutu later recruited the core of the PMR's ideologists from his group. In his other main capacity, Răutu helped set up and guide the PCR's Agitprop, or "Political Education", Section. It came into existence just months before the kingdom was replaced with a communist state, officially at the request of communist-controlled trade unions. The Agitprop Section embodied the PMR's control over the Education and Culture ministries, the Romanian Academy, the Radio Broadcasting Committee and cinema studios, the AGERPRES agency, the Writers' Union and the Artists' Union, and even sporting associations and clubs. From June 1948, Răutu also joined the editorial staff of a newly reestablished literary magazine, Viața Romînească. That same month, he lectured at the Soviet–Romanian House of Friendship about Russian philosopher Vissarion Belinsky.

Already in 1947, Răutu organized Agitprop's unified offensive against the nearly dissolved "reactionary" forces: the National Peasants' Party, framed during the Tămădău Affair; the National Liberal Party-Tătărescu, which Ana Pauker had pushed out of the coalition government; and the dissident Social Democrats, who had refused to be absorbed into the Communist-led "Workers' Party". His orders were for communist propaganda to focus on condemning the Western Allies and their Marshall Plan (see Vin americanii!), and on supporting the supposed growth in industrial production from homegrown socialist sources. Additionally, Răutu joined Pauker in combating the spread of Zionism, signing the party's 1948 Resolution on the National Issue, which assured the Romanian Jews that their national identity would not be jeopardized under Marxist rule.

Formally acknowledged as Chișinevschi's closest collaborator, a member of the central committee from 1948, and head of the Agitprop from 1956, Leonte Răutu is widely regarded as the dictator of Romanian cultural life until the death of party leader Gheorghiu-Dej. His credentials came from the communist essay Împotriva cosmopolitismului și obiectivismului burghez în științele sociale ("Against Cosmopolitanism and Bourgeois Objectivism in Social Science"), published by the party press and Lupta de Clasă journal in 1949. This work introduced Romanians to historical materialism and a partiinost' analysis of cultural or scientific matters, borrowing Soviet criticism of "bourgeois pseudoscience": against genetics, neo-Malthusianism, Indeterminism, and in large part against "cosmopolitan" social thinkers (Ernest Bevin, Léon Blum, Harold Laski). The two centuries of Romanian philosophy, from the advocates of Westernization (Titu Maiorescu) to the radical nativists (Nae Ionescu), were dismissed as irrelevant to the real priorities of Romanian workers, with Răutu firmly rooting Romania's past in Slavic Europe. Likewise, the right-wing historian Gheorghe I. Brătianu was depicted as both a "Hitlerite" and a puppet of "American imperialism". Răutu's text is regarded by Tismăneanu as an "embarrassing" contribution to the field, and described by historian Leonard Ciocan as the origin of "manichean" methodology and "typically Stalinist" discourse in Romanian social science.

His inspiration for such texts was Soviet culture boss Andrei Zhdanov, whose anti-formalist and anti-individualist campaigns he would try to replicate in Sovietized Romania. Since 1948, he had been preoccupied with eradicating "decadent" literature and art, including urban-themed modernism, but also informed his subordinates not to allow a resurgence of ruralizing traditionalism. He declared Zhdanov's "bitter criticism" of composer Dmitri Shostakovich to be a "profound" positive example: "Take the gloves off, let's start criticizing [as well]. Here too we can learn from the Soviets." Also then, he ordered a selection of publishing houses and literary magazines that followed a "just line", and set aside funds for financing writers who had internalized the Workers' Party principles and "stepped down from the ivory tower".

A notorious experiment approved by Răutu, and brought to life by Sorin Toma, was the campaign against celebrated poet Tudor Arghezi, attacked as a "decadent" and subsequently banned for a number of years. Looking back on the events in 1949, the Agitprop chief told his subordinates: "[Writers] who are still enemies must be stomped upon without mercy. Arghezi, who has not changed, not even today, I have fulminated." Other targets were literary critics Șerban Cioculescu and Vladimir Streinu, both depicted as ill-adapted to the spirit of socialist patriotism. In 1949, when Răutu began his purge of academia, one of the first to fall was literary historian George Călinescu, a professor at the University of Bucharest, who, although left-wing, was not considered a true communist. As such figures were sidelined, Răutu himself was given the Chair of Marxism-Leninism at Bucharest University, which he kept from March 1949 to May 1952. In April 1949, he was one of the Romanian delegates to the Congress of Advocates of Peace, seconding Mihail Sadoveanu (who reputedly eclipsed him). In January 1950, Răutu and Sadoveanu also organized Mihai Eminescu's centennial, followed in January 1952 by the Ion Luca Caragiale centennial.

Pauker's fall and "processing" campaign
Navigating his course between the warring PMR groups of Pauker and Gheorghiu-Dej, Răutu established his reputation during the fall of a third faction, Lucrețiu Pătrășcanu's "Secretariat" group. Already in Împotriva cosmopolitismului..., Răutu called his rival an "enemy of the working class", and a defamer of Marxist values. As noted by Tismăneanu, he applied "his proverbial zeal" to condemning Pătrășcanu's entire political activity. With the Tito–Stalin split, Răutu also became involved in exposing supposed "Titoist" infiltration in Romania, ordering a tight monitoring of Tanjug propaganda, and then a Romanian Agitprop project focused on vilifying Yugoslavia. As part of this effort, he commissioned Titus Popovici to write a play specifically against Titoism. In parallel, he took over supervision of the nominally independent left-wing daily Adevărul, overseeing its liquidation in 1951, and was involved in establishing the network of "people's councils", which cemented the communist grip on city and village administration during late 1950. In February 1951, he and Mihail Roller were guests of honor at the party marking the 76th birthday of poet Alexandru Toma.

Răutu first impressed critics of the regime by being able to survive Pauker's downfall (1952), and was one of the very few of the wartime exiles not to be designated a "Right deviationist". Together with Miron Constantinescu, the other PMR intellectual, he initiated the campaign to purge all other supposed inner-party oppositionists, drafting the PMR resolution on prelucrări ("processing", a euphemism for "interrogations"). In his speeches to the PMR sections, Răutu described the cadre verification policy as inspired by the 19th CPSU Congress and its talk of "ideological work" being paramount in the consolidation of socialism. He declared Pauker a saboteur of collectivization and her associate Vasile Luca guilty of "criminal activity".

In large part, "processing" meant a clampdown on writers with supposed (and supposedly concealed) "fascist" sympathies. A communist-turned-dissident poet, Nina Cassian, recalls: "Leonte Răutu—[...] dominated these scatty, vulnerable, terrified and confused beings—the artists and the writers, producing tragedies and comedies, stagings glories and stigmatization, paralyzing one's morality, activating another's immorality". Cassian was targeted as a critic of the regime, and kept under surveillance for her "negative influence" on other literary figures, including her lover of the time, Marin Preda. One author to escape from Răutu's campaigns was modernist left-winger Geo Dumitrescu, whom poet Eugen Jebeleanu defended, at the last moment, against claims that he had been working for far-right newspapers during the war years. Senior writers George Călinescu and Victor Eftimiu were accused of concealing Social Democratic sympathies; in 1951, Călinescu tried to ingratiate himself with Răutu by proposing him for admittance into the Romanian Academy, commending his essay on Joseph Stalin's contribution as a linguist. Meanwhile, historian Constantin Daicoviciu, a former member of the Iron Guard fascist movement, was found to be an embarrassment for the communist-run peace committees and banned from politics. Paradoxically, other areas under Răutu's control escaped such purges, and former far-right affiliates such as Octav Onicescu and Ion Barbu pursued their scientific careers with little standing in their way.

Răutu built himself a new power base comprising noted Agitprop figures, some of whom were also writers and journalists. The prominent ones were Moraru, Șelmaru, Savin Bratu, Ovid Crohmălniceanu, Paul Georgescu, Nicolae Tertulian and Ion Vitner. Over the years, his deputies included Roller, Ofelia Manole, Paul Niculescu-Mizil, Nicolae Goldberger (a member of the politburo since the 1930s), Manea Mănescu (in charge of science), Cornel Onescu and Pavel Țugui (later expelled from the party for having concealed his youthful sympathy for the Iron Guard). Some of his other favorites, including Constantin Ionescu Gulian (recovered from an initial put-down for his "cosmopolitan" discourse) and Ernő Gáll, became the official interpreters of Marxist philosophy.

Before and after 1952, Răutu's program was rigidly and thoroughly Stalinist. As such, Tismăneanu writes, he spearheaded the most damaging campaigns in the cultural field, "designed to terrorize Romania's intellectual class": "the destruction of Romanian Academy research institutes, the [Academy's own] mutilation, the forced Sovietization—[...] the gaudy kowtowing at Russian culture (as it had been defined under the Stalinist canon)—[...] the promotion of fanatics, of the ideologically possessed, impostors and dilettantes, to high cultural offices". In private diaries which recorded his critique of the regime, writer Pericle Martinescu spoke about Răutu's contribution to the "criminal combat" for "liquidating the old world." As he notes, a March 1952 article by Răutu condensed "an entire mass-murdering action against the Romanian people".

Răutu's monopoly on the humanities is also credited with having incapacitated the development of independent ideas in Romanian philosophy and sociology, as well as with the near-complete elimination of psychology as a credible academic subject. Instructed by Gheorghiu-Dej, the Agitprop chief even targeted Romania's pre-communist Marxist current as the school of "Menshevism"—announcing, in 1951, that Constantin Dobrogeanu-Gherea, the father of Romanian social democracy, was worthy of condemnation. Conversely, he and Ionescu Gulian attacked the conservative opinion-maker and Gherea's rival, Titu Maiorescu, as the icon of bourgeois conformity. 

The neotraditionalist philosopher Lucian Blaga, a contemporary of Răutu's, was also vilified. Blaga was the target of ominous commentary in the communist newspapers, singled out for revenge by the communist poet Mihai Beniuc, and ultimately derided in public by Răutu. Other main targets of Răutu's communist censorship were Tudor Vianu, Liviu Rusu (depicted as too idealistic) and Blaga's in-law Teodor Bugnariu. Răutu demanded that Rusu write an article condemning Maiorescu through the lens of Marxism-Leninism. A young scholar at the time, Mihai Șora described Răutu as the object of a fearful myth: "a censor with such keen eyes, that one will find it impossible to slip by [and] a very cultivated man, finding great pleasure in reading bourgeois, Western etc. literature, the very same one he will publicly condemn." 

Pursuing his ideological condemnation of philology, Răutu arrived at imposing Stalin's own tract, Marxism and Problems of Linguistics. Marxist linguists who were not keen on adopting Stalin's perspective, including Alexandru Rosetti, Alexandru Graur and Iorgu Iordan, were investigated for "enemy-like activity" and left virtually unemployed until 1954. Meanwhile, Răutu was censuring some of Roller's extreme positions in historiography, organizing a panel of historians, who were encouraged to discuss their problems; a review session was held in November 1954, and resulted in much loss of prestige for Roller. At that stage, the young communist activist Nicolae Ceaușescu was reporting to Răutu in matters of sport. Their activity included a 1953 investigation of the Central Army Club, suspected of "caste-like" factionalism and of "placing [its] interests above the interests of national sport." From January 1956 to 1959, the two men also oversaw a Party Commission for Nationality Issues, which assessed the communization of ethnic minorities.

"Anti-Revisionism"
Răutu was still unchallenged as cultural policymaker even as Stalin died, although the Romanian regime contemplated structural changes. After 1956, essentially his only superior within the party was Gheorghiu-Dej, who cared little for cultural intrigues. At the VIIth party congress in December 1955, Răutu became an alternate member of the politburo. Shortly after, he began an investigation into the activities of Nicolae Labiș, the disillusioned Marxist poet. Răutu signaled Labiș's fall into disgrace, declaring his piece "Murdered Albatross" to be pessimistic and unworthy of "building-sites that construct socialism."

The tensions between Gheorghiu-Dej and Soviet ruler Nikita Khrushchev were highlighted during the Hungarian revolution of 1956. Romania participated in the punitive expedition against Hungary. Răutu himself reported that the general public felt that Romania suffered "because of the terrible boners made by the Soviets in Hungary." Documenting the reorientation of the mid-1950s, scholar Ken Jowitt included Răutu and Gheorghiu-Dej's economic adviser, Alexandru Bârlădeanu, among the PMR "regime figures" who mediated "between the progressives and the Stalinists." When Gheorghiu-Dej, who played the two factions against each other, decided to overturn some of the Zhdanovist measures adopted in the 1950s, he even described Răutu and Roller as responsible for the PMR's frail relationship with the Romanian intellectuals.

Răutu had another close call at the Party Plenary of June 1957: Chișinevschi and Constantinescu were both attacked by Gheorghiu-Dej as "liberal socialists" and "revisionists", then expelled from the party's inner core. Even though he was one of Chișinevschi's confidants (and Natalia Răutu was Chișinevschi's secretary), Răutu managed to survive the incident and preserved his standing. He expressed full support for Gheorghiu-Dej, and was even tasked by the communist leader with redacting the Plenary documents for public view. He collaborated on this project with Ceaușescu, who was one of Gheorghiu-Dej's trusted men.

His only potential rival was Grigore Preoteasa, who joined the central committee's secretariat in charge of ideology shortly after Chișinevschi was sidelined. As Tismăneanu notes, this was a chance for Romanian culture to be revisited "with a modicum of decency". However, Preoteasa's death that November allowed Răutu undisputed control over culture. Răutu himself was injured in the Vnukovo Airfield accident that killed Preoteasa. His recovery in hospital brought an unexpected relaxation of censorship, which notably allowed ethnologists to write about the traditional Romanian dwellings (a theme that Răutu would have otherwise proscribed) and translators to focus on contemporary literature.

Upon returning, the PMR ideologist heralded an all-out anti-revisionist campaign: his May 1958 speech began with attacks on the anti-Soviet Internationalist Communist Union, Hungarian revolutionaries and "liberal theories"; went on to criticize Stalinist "dogmatism" and the "personality cult"; and eventually listed Romanian philosophers and artists who had deviated into one field or the other. Răutu reassessed his own political positioning, depicting Chișinevschi as a morbid Stalinist and himself as a balanced figure. During June 1958, he and Gheorghiu-Dej produced a case against the PMR veteran Constantin Doncea, who had been tempted to question Gheorghiu-Dej's claims of revolutionary primacy. Răutu labeled Doncea a Titoist, then came up with claims that Doncea had followers in the cultural sphere—a pretext for the verification of writers who still harbored modernist ideas. This happened even as Răutu drafted a confidential note about improving relations with Yugoslavia and toning down anti-Titoist propaganda.

In summer 1958, Răutu went public with his critique of Roller, who had allegedly permitted his subordinates to publish complaints against Gheorghiu-Dej. In a contrary move, Răutu intervened to sideline several of Roller's emerging critics, including Andrei Oțetea. Though not involved directly in the controversy, he sent on of his associates to act as Oțetea's ideological supervisor; according to historian Șerban Papacostea, this unnamed figure had little competence in the scholarly field, noted among his peers for being unable to properly date events such as the Treaty of Passarowitz. The PMR cultural activists, Răutu included, also masterminded the show trial of philosopher Constantin Noica, writer Dinu Pillat and other literary dissidents, all of them brutalized by the Securitate secret police. He preserved much of his great influence, from directing the censorship apparatus (officially placed under Iosif Ardeleanu) to putting out Scînteia (approving each issue before it went into printing).

Transition to national communism
While the regime veered into de-satellization and Stalinized national communism, Răutu and Niculescu-Mizil were asked by Gheorghiu-Dej to press the Soviets into recognizing Romania's role in the defeat of Nazism. They raised the issue at an international congress of communist historians in 1959, when they informed their Soviet counterpart, N. I. Shatagin, that they expected a revision of the Soviet official line. Niculescu-Mizil sees his boss as partly responsible for transmitting Romania's new terms to the Comecon and the Warsaw Pact, whose sessions he attended in 1961–1963. In tandem, Răutu engineered some of the newer campaigns to quash alternative culture, indicating suspects to the Securitate. These included: communist writers Alexandru Jar and Gábor Gaál, attacked for having demanded de-Stalinization; modernist sculptor Milița Petrașcu, "unmasked" as an opponent of the regime in a humiliating public session; and classical composer Mihail Andricu, castigated for having revealed his appreciation for the West. Historian Stefano Bottoni argues that, in Jar's case, Răutu may have set a trap for a former friend, by inviting Jar to state openly his critique of the PMR line.

Răutu also refused to reinstate the modernist poet-translator Ion Vinea, calling him artistically irrelevant and an agent of British Intelligence. In 1960, he returned to the George Călinescu issue, accusing him of deviating from the PMR program. Răutu's men suggested that, as a novelist, Călinescu had portrayed the Iron Guard in too light tones; Călinescu made a personal appeal to Gheorghiu-Dej, who treated him with noted sympathy. They registered defeat when Gheorghiu-Dej allowed Călinescu to publish his novel Scrinul negru. Later in 1960, Călinescu was allowed to lecture at the university, but still not reinstated as professor.

Tasked by the politburo with controlling the Romanian Jewish community, Răutu became a denouncer of the "Ioanid Gang". This name was applied to a cell of Jewish anti-communists who managed to rob the National Bank of Romania; captured, they were also accused of having plotted Răutu's murder. Such issues troubled the cultural ideologist: Răutu looked on as the Jews, discriminated against by the PMR's antisemitic lobby, registered for mass emigration to Israel. Răutu asked the party leaders not to strip all those who applied of their Romanian citizenship, and, responding to Gheorghiu-Dej's antisemitic comments, concluded that Romanian communism had failed at integrating the Jewish minority.

Eventually, Răutu resigned himself to adopting Gheorghiu-Dej's view. He is purported as the author of a Jewish self-hatred catchphrase, taken up by the (predominantly Romanian PMR) leaders: "Jews should lose their habit of controlling things". As the party began expelling significant numbers of its Jewish members, a confidential note circulated at the top confirmed that, even in 1958, Răutu was expressing strongly antisemitic feelings. According to one eyewitness account, Răutu attacked artist Iosif Molnár for having illustrated the Romanian edition of Anne Frank's Diary with a stylized yellow badge. Instead of seeing this as a symbol of the Holocaust, Răutu accused Molnár of promoting Zionism, then ordered him to attend a "self-criticism" session. Brucan recounts that Gheorghiu-Dej exhibited "lucidity" in noting that Răutu was downplaying both his Jewishness and his Russian mannerism. Brucan himself notes that Răutu had "systematically removed all Jews" from the Agitprop department, and "went as far as to pretend that he could not speak Russian" when receiving Soviet visitors.

Similarly, Răutu was among those sent in to pacify the Hungarian Romanian minority, and (Bottoni writes) played "the role of a nationalist", airbrushing Romanianization measures, demanding action against the "hostile elements" supporting Hungarian nationalism, and participating in the disestablishment of Bolyai University. From September 1959, controlling the spread of "bourgeois nationalism" among the Hungarians was a permanent task, assigned to a PMR committee presided over by Ceaușescu and Răutu—its other job, of promoting minority interests, was entirely ceremonial. Allegedly, the two men also had differences of opinion: in January 1961, the censorship apparatus, probably instigated by Răutu, attempted to institute a ban against Aurel Baranga's play, Siciliana; Ceaușescu, who admired Baranga's work, intervened to block the attempt.

Speaking at a 1962 short course session, Răutu boasted that the 40,000 Agitprop Section activists had educated 1.4 million young Romanians, all of them inspired by the "party leaders' exigence" in the project to build a socialist society. Some liberalization measures were nevertheless being unveiled, and Răutu, officially introduced as a member of the Great National Assembly, found himself included in Gheorghiu-Dej's official delegation to the United States. He was notoriously silent as his former colleagues and favorites were pushed into retirement (Moraru, Țugui, Vitner) or trapped in "unmasking" sessions. Beniuc and Socialist Realist artist Constantin Baraschi both kept a grudge against Răutu, who did not defend them when the national communists made them bear the blame. Răutu and Paul Cornea were also tasked with convincing the writing team behind the film Tudor that the lead female part should go to Lica Gheorghiu, who was Gheorghiu-Dej's daughter.

After having sidelined Sorin Toma, Răutu revised his stance on the "decadent" poets, welcoming back into the spotlight modernists like Arghezi and Ion Barbu, and even describing himself as a protector of artistic autonomy. In 1962, he tacitly approved of the PMR's policy of politically (re)integrating some of Romania's more popular traditionalist intellectuals. However, Răutu and other PMR leaders also singled out the Writers' Union chief, novelist Zaharia Stancu, as a political suspect. According to literary historian Cornel Ungureanu, Răutu stated the point discreetly, "without aggravating the Great Chief [that is, Gheorghiu-Dej, who believed Stancu to be an earnest fellow communist]". By then, Răutu was receiving letters from politically suspect writers such as Păstorel Teodoreanu and George Mărgărit, who asked to be reinstated, as reeducated but starving men. Răutu still silenced critiques of Stalinism, but only by proxy. In 1963, on Răutu's orders, Romania became, with Albania, the only Eastern Bloc country not to publish a vernacular translation of Aleksandr Solzhenitsyn's Ivan Denisovich.

Răutu was afforded the privilege of accompanying Gheorghiu-Dej to New York City for the Fifteenth Regular Session of the United Nations General Assembly, held in September 1960. In 1963, Niculescu-Mizil sought and obtained support from Răutu in establishing the world-affairs magazine Lumea, with George Ivașcu, the former political detainee, as an editor. This publication was an explicit alternative to the local edition of Novoye Vremya, signaling that Romania was no longer tributary to Soviet foreign politics. By 1964, when Gheorghiu-Dej signaled Romania's full detachment from the de-Stalinized Soviet Union, Răutu was again called upon for ideological maneuvering. Gheorghiu-Dej sided with Red China in the Sino–Soviet divorce, and Răutu helped redact the "April Theses" recognizing "the sovereign rights of each socialist state". He was afterward heard stating his disgust for past Sovietization, leaving readers shocked with his comments on those "who have shamefully kowtowed at even the most insignificant Soviet creation"; he also praised "national values" in the scientific field. He enabled Gheorghiu-Dej's anti-Hungarian rhetoric by sending him a report on the nationalistic statements made by various Hungarian authors and tolerated by the Hungarian communist government. Răutu also looked on as the regime allowed a partial recovery of his philosophical bugbears (Dobrogeanu-Gherea, then Maiorescu) and a controlled familiarization with Western literature or modernism.

As Ceaușescu's aide

Despite his concessions to localism, the Bessarabian communist still looked to the Soviet hardliners for inspiration, and was considered by his peers a Stalinist survivor, à la Mikhail Suslov. Răutu is said to have been thankful that Chișinevschi was out of politics altogether, but was embarrassed by Miron Constantinescu's re-admittance into the nomenklatura; in front of other party figures, the two men acted like good friends. The party even selected Răutu to inform his nominal enemy that he had been widowed, Sulamita Constantinescu having been stabbed by her own daughter. Oțetea, who had finally been successful in toppling Roller from his position of Marxist historiographer, is said to have described Răutu as "the most intelligent of the communist leaders, but a bastard".

In 1964, Gheorghiu-Dej's terminal illness transformed Răutu into an unconditional supporter of Ceaușescu, who was emerging as the new party leader; Niculescu-Mizil recalls being informed by Răutu that "you and I must obey Ceaușescu from now on". Conflicted by his own social and ethnic origins, Răutu sought good relations with Ceaușescu, a relationship strengthened due to the friendship between Răutu's wife Natalia and Elena Ceaușescu. His cordial rapport with the Ceaușescu couple, developed during the Gheorghiu-Dej era, together with (historians suggest) his chameleon-like persona, helps account for his longevity in public life. Holding approximately equal party ranks, the two men and their families were also recipients of a luxury trip to France, arranged by Gheorghiu-Dej and with television presenter Tudor Vornicu as their guide. Răutu managed to impress Ceaușescu, even though the latter was not just fearful of the PMR prison elite, but also a nationalist with antisemitic reactions.

Leonte Răutu authored Gheorghiu-Dej's official obituary, as published by Scînteia, and oversaw the funeral ceremony. After Ceaușescu's ascent in 1965, Răutu's positions included membership on the central committee secretariat (elected March 22, 1964) and the executive committee, deputy prime minister supervising education (1969 to 1972) and, from 1974 to 1981, rector of the Ștefan Gheorghiu Academy. When the new leader decided to reformulate Communist Party historiography, Răutu was among those tasked with compiling the short course in such a way as to describe the various ideological slips under Gheorghiu-Dej. Researched during 1965, the book was never completed. The same year, Răutu witnessed as Baranga stepped in to impose censorship in theater, by arguing that all plays by Eugène Ionesco other than Rhinoceros needed to be withdrawn from the national repertoire. Baranga cited Răutu  as an authority on this issue but, as historian Cristian Vasile notes, this may have been tongue-in-cheek.

Despite the protection he enjoyed, Răutu found that his advancement within the party was curbed, with Ceaușescu informing him that theirs was not an equal partnership. 1966 was thus a low point in Răutu's career, as he was only tasked with supervising the interior commerce department and the Communist Youth's Pioneer branch. According to Tismăneanu, Răutu spent much of the interval reading up on political literature, including Neo-Marxist authors frowned upon by the regime (Herbert Marcuse). In January 1967, he gave approval to publish the popular history review, Magazin Istoric. As noted by its editor, Titu Georgescu, Răutu had to be persuaded by more sympathetic party figures, including Niculescu-Mizil and Ștefan Voitec. Also according to Georgescu, Răutu signed off on an order to double Magazin Istorics circulation, but did so without realizing that the review was already published in 60,000 copies. That year, he was similarly defeated in his attempt to prevent the regime from publishing a posthumous edition of Călinescu's main literary tract, Istoria literaturii.

In February 1970, Răutu was officially recommended for membership of the new Academy of Social and Political Sciences, formed by Constantinescu—one of the old Stalinist to be inducted, he served there alongside non-communists such as Daicoviciu, Mihai Berza, and Henri H. Stahl; both he and Constantinescu attempted "a sort of modernization of party propaganda", aimed at getting youth interested in Marxism-Leninism. Răutu had by then shown personal initiative in interpreting the party line and even anticipated Ceaușescu's ideological permutations. After the July Theses of 1971 put a stop to liberalization and introduced the more repressive phase of national communism, he welcomed Ceaușescu's commands as "a model in Marxist-Leninist analysis" and the subjugation of culture to political economy as "an active, revolutionary, attitude"; he also informed the party that the time had come for himself to reexamine his past and determine his own "mistakes". In late 1972, he supported and obtained a ban on Liviu Ciulei's production of the The Government Inspector, which he and other party men regarded as too forward, following a negative report from Baranga. Ciulei himself argued that his work was only targeted because of a "showdown" between Răutu and fellow party boss Dumitru Popescu-Dumnezeu—since the latter had actively promoted the play.

Niculescu-Mizil was Răutu's first replacement at the Agitprop section, which now ran a more covert form of censorship. At the lavishly furnished and overbudgeted Gheorghiu Academy, Răutu set up a "Laboratory for Research into Contemporary Historical Progress", dedicated to defending communist dogma against "the illusion of technocracy". Tismăneanu argues that this think tank was merely "bizarre"; he describes Răutu's theories as "clichés" or "platitudes". Literary scholar Nicolae Manolescu recalls catching a glimpse of Răutu in the seaside resort of Neptun, at some point in the mid 1970s. He "was sitting in a deckchair, reading French and American magazines. Even back when he was head of agitprop, Leonte Răutu, the intelligent and cultured an that he was, had access to all sources of cultural information that so many Romanian intellectuals could only long for." As rector, Răutu presented the communist leader with a Ph.D. in Politics on Ceaușescu's 60th birthday in January 1978. At that stage Răutu was assigned to the Party and State Committee which organized the 15th International Congress of Historical Sciences (Bucharest, 1980), which Ceaușescu intended to use for broadcasting Dacianist theories. 

At the XIIth Party Congress in 1979, Răutu issued a spontaneous and violent attack against fellow PCR veteran Constantin Pîrvulescu, who had taken the floor to ad-lib about Ceaușescu's separation from Marxism. In a February 1980 speech that saw print in Scînteia, he gave his retouched version of communist history: claiming to have been one of the first communists to take note of young Ceaușescu's "exceptional courage and brilliant intelligence", he extended his gratitude to "my beloved Comrade Nicolae Ceaușescu" for taking on the role of ideological guide in the eyes of "each and all party activists". In March, Răutu was assigned to the central committee's commission on Ideology, Politics, Cultural and Socialist Education; in May, he returned as vice president of the Higher Council of Education. Also that year, he received two of Communist Romania's major distinctions: the Star of the Socialist Republic, 1st Class (granted, on his 70th birthday, for merits "in constructing the multilaterally developed socialist society"), and the 25th Anniversary of the Motherland's Liberation Medal.

Downfall and final years
From the mid-1970s, Răutu was practically a widower. Natalia Răutu, plagued by episodic migraines since the 1940s, was diagnosed with viral encephalitis after slipping into a coma; she was kept under specialized care at Elias Hospital but never recovered. The former head of Agitprop began noticing that the relatives of various communist potentates were using their relative freedom of travel and defecting to the West. Knowing that his own family had little appreciation for Ceaușescu, he expressed fears that, should the same happen to him, the central committee would never pardon it. A Securitate operative reported in August 1979 that Răutu and Ghizela Vass were perceived by at least one source as nomenklatura contacts for the KGB and the StB. According to such rumors, the two had "friendly meetings" with KGB sources and with each other, discussing "changes to the external agenda of our party and state." In 1981, Răutu allowed Romanian-born scholar Lilly Marcou to do research at Ștefan Gheorghiu. As Marcou reports: "[Răutu] allowed me to do my work, and helped me with it. [...] I had a meeting with the heads of departments, with the researchers at [this] institution, and I told them what I believed on what was happening in Romania: that it was a shame and a great bane for the country that all around I saw portraits of the Ceaușescus, that they were all one could see on TV etc. I spoke about that at the very core of the party. No one answered, but neither did they threaten me or contradict me."

Around that time, Ceaușescu's austerity policy had caused a rift between Romania and the West, prompting the regime to fall back on a stricter application of Marxist-Leninism. In March 1981, communist potentate Gogu Rădulescu informed his friends that, as a result of this transition, Răutu "jumped up" in political importance. Later that year, Răutu's son-in-law Andrei Coler and his daughter Lena applied for emigration to the United States. Reportedly, news of this unprecedented act infuriated Ceaușescu, who "was bedridden for four days on the advice of his doctors"; Răutu himself tried to underscore his loyalty by asking that his relatives' Romanian passports be "frozen". In retribution for the Colers' move, but also accused of not having fulfilled his own political tasks, Răutu was made to present his resignation from the party's central committee; he was also made to renounce his rectorate in August 1981. Niculescu-Mizil, who had advanced to the party's central leadership, recalls his opposition to Răutu's removal, claiming to have personally reminded Ceaușescu that Răutu had fully supported him in 1964. 

This ouster left the former ideologist entirely isolated, a recluse on the Romanian political scene. In his report for the exile station Radio Free Europe, Noël Bernard assessed: "Nobody is going to shed tears over the fall of Leonte Răutu." Bernard also derided the communists' hypocrisy: Răutu, he noted, had been forced out because his daughter emigrated; Miron Constantinescu advanced steadily, his own daughter a mentally disturbed matricide. Theater historian Mircea Morariu also notes that Răutu was made an example of, whereas Baranga, whose son Harry had also emigrated, had been spared persecution. Tismăneanu adds: "The 'perfect acrobat' [fell] victim to the very dialectical-Balkanic mechanism that he so decisively helped generate [...] Răutu had been thrown into the grim anonymity that had consumed the last years of his so many associates in youthful daydreaming." Răutu moved out into a regular house of protocol, and worked for the party's own History Institute. Răutu's last years were marked by panic and confusion: although it gave him pleasure to see Ceaușescu being tried and executed during the Romanian Revolution of 1989, that event saw the formal destruction of a political and symbolic structure to which he had dedicated his life. An unverifiable rumor even places Răutu among the dejected old-generation communists who prepared their return under a "Constantin Dăscălescu Government". 

Reportedly fearing anti-communist repression, Răutu supported Ion Iliescu, a former PMR man and his former employee at the Agitprop Section, whom the Revolution had propelled to the rank of President. Iliescu later acknowledged that he felt respect for Răutu. The post-revolutionary republic did not impinge on the privileges Leonte Răutu had gained, as an old communist militant, under Gheorghiu-Dej. Legally included in a category of "antifascist combatants", he continued to receive a large pension and was eligible for special medical care. Răutu gave his only in-depth interview to Pierre du Bois, a Swiss political scientist, acknowledging that the communist system had produced tens of thousands of victims but expressing no remorse. He died shortly after, in September 1993, and was cremated at Cenușa furnace, to the tune of The Internationale.

Legacy
According to Vladimir Tismăneanu and Cristian Vasile, who cite various other authors, Răutu was not just responsible for cultural repression, but also for the characteristically "ill-adapted", "dull", and "anti-intellectual" essence of Romanian communist propaganda at all times between 1950 and 1989. According to poet-journalist Radu Cosașu (himself a figure in 1950s literature), Răutu is personally responsible for a slip of the wooden tongue, allowing the notion of Eastern Bloc to be rendered in Romanian as lagărul socialist—which can also be read as "socialist concentration camp".

A renegade Stalinist and a defector, Petru Dumitriu, satirized Leonte Răutu (as "Malvolio") and Gheorghiu-Dej (as "Amon Ra") in political novels he wrote abroad. As Dumitriu's anti-hero, Răutu goes from fiery intellectual to corrupt and surfeited bureaucrat. The mid to late 1960s ignited a bookish flare of indignation at home, when some of the intellectuals harmed by Răutu's Stalinist policies took their literary revenge. In 1965, Writers' Union president Zaharia Stancu publicly asked Ceaușescu to let Răutu follow in the trail of Chișinevschi, identifying the former as a Stalinist mastermind. According to Stancu, Chișinevschi had been more of a "dilettante" pawn. After personal tragedy led him to reconsider Stalinism (and possibly communism altogether), poet Eugen Jebeleanu also turned on Răutu. The notion of "perfect acrobat", used by Tismăneanu to qualify Răutu's record as a political survivor, was originally the title of a Jebeleanu piece:

Marxist dissident Alexandru Ivasiuc portrayed Răutu (as "Valeriu Trotușeanu") in the novel Cunoaștere de noapte ("Nightly Knowledge"): the fictional cat-like Răutu spins a web of arguments, admitting his minor errors to divert focus from his crimes. Critic Nicolae Dragoș, who was in the process of moving from Stalinism to nationalism, made a point of saluting Ivasiuc's book: his own editorial for the review România Literară carried the unsettling title Te recunosc, domnule Trotușeanu ("I Recognize You, Mr. Trotușeanu"). A more nationalistic indictment of 1950s policies is found in Dinu Săraru's novel Dragostea și revoluția ("Love and Revolution"), where the antagonist, a politico by the name of "Anghel Tocsobie", is probably based on Răutu. Presumably, the national communists allowed such works to see print because they helped remind Răutu that he was always under their scrutiny.

Although Ceaușescu countersigned Răutu's downfall and allowed a condemnation of Răutu's erstwhile proteges, little was published on the ideologist's own career, and almost no negative reinvestigation saw print before 1989. Researchers such as Ileana Vrancea and Ion Cristoiu, who tackled the more delicate subjects of Stalinist culture and were condemned by the communist press as borderline dissidents, refrained from even mentioning Răutu by name. Benefiting from his seniority in the communist movement, academician Iorgu Iordan made at least one reference to Răutu's problematic decision-making, even before Răutu had been sidelined: Iordan's version of events is preserved in his 1979 memoirs.

Răutu's contribution as a propagandist was entirely absent from official reference works such as the 1978 biographical dictionary of Romanian historiography. Although highly decorated and commended as a positive example, the Agitprop Section founder was generally introduced as a dedicated "party activist", a communist powerhouse rather than a national instructor: while honoring him with the Star of the Socialist Republic, Ceaușescu made sure to remind the audience that Răutu's history had its share of "minuses and unfulfilled chapters".

A controversial perspective on Răutu's public role and legacy was taken up from the late 1980s, with roots in the 1960s, by journalists and critics such as Eugen Barbu and Mihai Ungheanu. Such authors, criticized in turn as xenophobic and even antisemitic, suggest that there was a Jewish-and-communist conspiracy against the very spirit of Romanian culture. This lobby, associated for a while with the journal Luceafărul, was tolerated by Ceaușescu as the radical facet of his national communism: Barbu and fellow novelist Ion Lăncrănjan, who had debuted as orthodox Stalinists and had won Răutu's approval, became proponents of the neotraditionalist revival. In contrast to theirs, largely positive assessments of Răutu survive in memoirs and interviews by Iliescu and by his Agitprop Section successor, Dumitru Popescu-Dumnezeu.

Răutu's daughter Anca Oroveanu and her husband Mihai Oroveanu stayed behind in Romania after the Colers left for America, and continued to visit Răutu. Anca Oroveanu is an art historian, known for her studies in postmodern art. Mihai Oroveanu, a noted art photographer, is a co-founder of the National Museum of Contemporary Art. Răutu's nephews are anthropologist Andrei Oișteanu and poet Valery Oisteanu; the latter directly challenged his uncle by promoting the literary avant-garde in the 1960s.

Notes

References

1910 births
1993 deaths
Romanian communists
Communist Party of Moldavia politicians
Members of the Great National Assembly
20th-century Romanian civil servants
Academic staff of the University of Bucharest
Rectors of universities in Romania
Recipients of the Order of the Star of the Romanian Socialist Republic
Romanian censors
Censorship in Romania
Romanian propagandists
Moldovan propagandists
Romanian radio people
Soviet publishers (people)
Anti-revisionists
Jewish socialists
Jewish anti-Zionism in Romania
People from Bălți
People from Beletsky Uyezd
Bessarabian Jews
Moldovan Jews
Jewish Romanian politicians
Romanian atheists
Jewish atheists
Moldovan magazine editors
Romanian magazine editors
Romanian newspaper editors
Romanian emigrants to the Soviet Union
Inmates of Doftana prison
Romanian people of the Spanish Civil War
Soviet people of World War II
Romanian people of World War II